is a passenger railway station located in the city of Hannan, Osaka Prefecture, Japan, operated by the private railway operator Nankai Electric Railway. It has the station number "NK39".

Lines

Layout
The station has two opposed side platforms serving two tracks. Separate station buildings are located for each platform, and it is not possible to change platforms within the station.

Platforms

Adjacent stations

History
Hakotsukuri Station opened on 22 October 1898.

Passenger statistics
In fiscal 2019, the station was used by an average of 2466 passengers daily.

Surrounding area
Hakotsukuri Beach (Pichi Pichi Beach)
Hannan Municipal Shimoso Elementary School
Sennan Satoumi Park

See also
 List of railway stations in Japan

References

External links

  

Railway stations in Japan opened in 1898
Railway stations in Osaka Prefecture
Hannan, Osaka